In finance, the Vasicek model is a mathematical model describing the evolution of interest rates. It is a type of one-factor short-rate model as it describes interest rate movements as driven by only one source of market risk. The model can be used in the valuation of interest rate derivatives, and has also been adapted for credit markets. It was introduced in 1977 by Oldřich Vašíček, and can be also seen as a stochastic investment model.

Details
The model specifies that the instantaneous interest rate follows the stochastic differential equation:

where Wt is a Wiener process under the risk neutral framework modelling the random market risk factor, in that it models the continuous inflow of randomness into the system. The standard deviation parameter, determines the volatility of the interest rate and in a way characterizes the amplitude of the instantaneous randomness inflow.

 : "long term mean level". All future trajectories of  will evolve around a mean level b in the long run;
 : "instantaneous volatility", measures instant by instant the amplitude of randomness entering the system. Higher  implies more randomness

The following derived quantity is also of interest,

 : "long term variance". All future trajectories of  will regroup around the long term mean with such variance after a long time.

This is clear when looking at the long term variance,

This model is an Ornstein–Uhlenbeck stochastic process. Making the long term mean stochastic to another SDE is a simplified version of the cointelation SDE.

Discussion

Vasicek's model was the first one to capture mean reversion, an essential characteristic of the interest rate that sets it apart from other financial prices. Thus, as opposed to stock prices for instance, interest rates cannot rise indefinitely. This is because at very high levels they would hamper economic activity, prompting a decrease in interest rates. Similarly, interest rates do not usually decrease below 0. As a result, interest rates move in a limited range, showing a tendency to revert to a long run value.

The drift factor  represents the expected instantaneous change in the interest rate at time t. The parameter b represents the long-run equilibrium value towards which the interest rate reverts. Indeed, in the absence of shocks, the interest rate remains constant when rt = b. The parameter a, governing the speed of adjustment, needs to be positive to ensure stability around the long term value. For example, when rt is below b, the drift term  becomes positive for positive a, generating a tendency for the interest rate to move upwards (toward equilibrium).

The main disadvantage is that, under Vasicek's model, it is theoretically possible for the interest rate to become negative, an undesirable feature under pre-crisis assumptions. This shortcoming was fixed in the Cox–Ingersoll–Ross model, exponential Vasicek model, Black–Derman–Toy model and Black–Karasinski model, among many others. The Vasicek model was further extended in the Hull–White model. The Vasicek model is also a canonical example of the affine term structure model, along with the Cox–Ingersoll–Ross model. In recent research both models were used for data partitioning and forecasting.

Asymptotic mean and variance
We solve the stochastic differential equation to obtain

Using similar techniques as applied to the Ornstein–Uhlenbeck stochastic process we get that state variable is distributed normally with mean

and variance

Consequently, we have

and

Bond pricing
Under the no-arbitrage assumption, a discount bond may be priced in the Vasicek model. The time  value of a discount bond with maturity date  is exponential affine in the interest rate: 

where

See also
 Ornstein–Uhlenbeck process.
 Hull–White model
 Cox–Ingersoll–Ross model

References

External links
 The Vasicek Model, Bjørn Eraker, Wisconsin School of Business
 Yield Curve Estimation and Prediction with the Vasicek Model, D. Bayazit, Middle East Technical University

Interest rates
Fixed income analysis
Short-rate models
Financial models